Cincinnatus Historic District is a historic district in Cincinnatus, New York that was listed on the National Register of Historic Places in 1984.

It consists of 14 properties with 27 contributing structures dating from c.1830 to 1930: a former church, a library, and 12 residences, plus related outbuildings.

The properties included are:
former Congregational Church (Heritage Hall)
2781 Taylor Ave.
former Congregational Church Manse (Rogers/Seeley residence)
5691 Main St.
Kellogg Free Library
Main St. & Taylor Ave.
Kingman Store (Speciale residence)
5680 Main St.
Barnes-Brown residence
2789 Taylor Ave.
Rockwell-Randal residence
2797 Taylor Ave.
Meldrin-Totman residence
2803 Taylor Ave.
Staley residence
2809 Taylor Ave.
Brown-Forshee residence
2815 Taylor Ave.
Smith-Wight residence
2800 Taylor Ave.
Shore residence
2794 Taylor Ave.
Kingman-Pryor residence
2788 Taylor Ave.
Covert-Simonet/Kopecky residence
2770 Taylor Ave.
White-Glazen residence
2769 Taylor Ave.

In July 1984, the Kellogg Free Library filed notification to the New York State Office of Parks that it did not wish to have the Rogers-Seeley residence listed as part of the district; no reason was cited.  The Rogers-Seeley residence remained on the application that was approved for inclusion on the National Register.

References

External links

Historic districts on the National Register of Historic Places in New York (state)
Historic districts in Cortland County, New York
National Register of Historic Places in Cortland County, New York